Montigny is the name, or part of the name, of several places:

Belgium 
 Montigny-le-Tilleul, a Walloon municipality located in the Belgian province of Hainaut

Several communes in northern France
Montigny, Calvados, in the Calvados  
Montigny, Cher, in the Cher  
Montigny, Loiret, in the Loiret  
Montigny, Manche, in the Manche  
Montigny, Meurthe-et-Moselle, in the Meurthe-et-Moselle  
Montigny, Sarthe, in the Sarthe  
Montigny, Seine-Maritime, in the Seine-Maritime  
Montigny-aux-Amognes, in the Nièvre  
Montigny-devant-Sassey, in the Meuse  
Montigny-en-Arrouaise, in the Aisne  
Montigny-en-Cambrésis, in the Nord  
Montigny-en-Gohelle, in the Pas-de-Calais  
Montigny-en-Morvan, in the Nièvre  
Montigny-en-Ostrevent, in the Nord  
Montigny-l'Allier, in the Aisne 
Montigny-la-Resle, in the Yonne  
Montigny-le-Bretonneux, in the Yvelines  
Montigny-le-Chartif, in the Eure-et-Loir  
Montigny-le-Franc, in the Aisne  
Montigny-le-Gannelon, in the Eure-et-Loir  
Montigny-le-Guesdier, in the Seine-et-Marne 
Montigny-Lencoup, in the Seine-et-Marne  
Montigny-Lengrain, in the Aisne  
Montigny-lès-Arsures, in the Jura 
Montigny-lès-Cherlieu, in the Haute-Saône  
Montigny-lès-Condé, in the Aisne  
Montigny-lès-Cormeilles, in the Val-d'Oise  
Montigny-les-Jongleurs, in the Somme  
Montigny-lès-Metz, in the Moselle  
Montigny-les-Monts, in the Aube  
Montigny-lès-Vaucouleurs, in the Meuse  
Montigny-lès-Vesoul, in the Haute-Saône  
Montigny-Montfort, in the Côte-d'Or  
Montigny-Mornay-Villeneuve-sur-Vingeanne, in the Côte-d'Or  
Montigny-Saint-Barthélemy, in the Côte-d'Or  
Montigny-sous-Marle, in the Aisne  
Montigny-sur-Armançon, in the Côte-d'Or  
Montigny-sur-Aube, in the Côte-d'Or  
Montigny-sur-Avre, in the Eure-et-Loir  
Montigny-sur-Canne, in the Nièvre  
Montigny-sur-Chiers, in the Meurthe-et-Moselle  
Montigny-sur-Crécy, in the Aisne 
Montigny-sur-l'Ain, in the Jura  
Montigny-sur-l'Hallue, in the Somme  
Montigny-sur-Loing, in the Seine-et-Marne  
Montigny-sur-Meuse, in the Ardennes  
Montigny-sur-Vence, in the Ardennes  
Montigny-sur-Vesle, in the Marne